
Gmina Doruchów is a rural gmina (administrative district) in Ostrzeszów County, Greater Poland Voivodeship, in west-central Poland.

Villages
Gmina Doruchów contains the villages and settlements of Doruchów, Godziętowy, Gruszków, Mieleszówka, Morawin, Oświęcim, Pieczyska, Plugawice, Przytocznica, Rudniczysko, Skarydzew, Stara Kuźnica, Tokarzew, Tonia, Torzeniec, Torzeniec PGR, Wrzosy, Wygoda Plugawska, Wygoda Tokarska and Zalesie.

Neighbouring gminas
Gmina Doruchów is bordered by the gminas of Galewice, Grabów nad Prosną, Kępno, Ostrzeszów and Wieruszów.

References

 Polish official population figures 2006

Doruchow
Ostrzeszów County